WMFG can refer to:

 WMFG (AM), a radio station (1240 AM) licensed to Hibbing, Minnesota, United States
 WMFG-FM, a radio station (106.3 FM) licensed to Hibbing, Minnesota, United States